Monticello Township is a former township in northwest Johnson County, Kansas. It is now merged with Lenexa and Shawnee, Kansas.

History
In 1858 Monticello elected 21-year-old James Butler Hickok (better known as Wild Bill Hickok) as town constable. At one time Monticello had a stage shop, stores, saloons, blacksmith, doctor, hotel, general store, school house, churches, and about 15 dwellings. The 1910 population was about 63. The town was bypassed by the Kansas Midland Railroad (Atchison, Topeka and Santa Fe), which instead passed Olathe which caused the town to lose its county seat status.

Before its annexation, Monticello Township was the natural crossroads for fur trading and later westward emigration by wagon.

See also
Oregon Trail
California Trail
Harold "Jug" McSpaden - PGA Tour player and golf course architect
National Agricultural Center and Hall of Fame north along K-7 Corridor

References

Notable residents 
 Manuel Lisa - Fur trader
 Wild Bill Hickok - Lawman
 Jug McSpaden - Professional golfer
 William S. Williams - Mountain man

External links
  City of Shawnee Kansas: Historic Towns Revised version (June, 2006)
 Important dates (1541-2003)
 Monticello Township passes into history (January, 2006)
 KCAHTA: Kansas City Area Historical Trails Association
 Lost Cities of Johnson County: Monticello
 Historic Frontier Trails Map A full-color map of the trails of Johnson, Wyandotte and part of Leavenworth Counties, Kansas
 Kaw Valley Heritage: Monticello Ferry Company
 Lost Towns of Johnson County

Townships in Johnson County, Kansas
Kansas City metropolitan area
California Road
Townships in Kansas
Populated places disestablished in 2002
1858 establishments in Kansas Territory